is a city park in Chūō-ku, Sapporo, Hokkaido, Japan. The park has a lake, two streams, a museum, a concert hall, an observatory, a historical building housing a tea shop, and several lawns and forests. At the south end, there are two shrines.

Overview 

The park has about 5,000 trees, including Japanese red spruce, yew, ginkgo, Sargent's cherry, black acacia, and Japanese elm. 

The largest feature of the park is Shobu Pond, located near the center of the park.

The park contains the Sapporo Concert Hall, also known as "Kitara". Opened on 1997, it is the largest concert hall in Hokkaido, and houses a large main hall, small chamber music hall, and rehearsal rooms. A restaurant, nursery room, and museum shop are also located in the building.

The Sapporo Astronomical Observatory, Nakajima Sports Center, Puppet Theatre, Children's Hall, Hokkaido Museum of Literature, a Japanese Garden, Hasso-an (tea house), and Hōheikan, (historical building and wedding venue), are among the attractions of the Park.

The park also contains some sports grounds (tennis courts). These are open between  April and November every year. The park is also popular for boating in summer, on the Shobu Pond, and cross-country skiing in winter.

History 
Prior to the construction of Nakajima Park, in 1874, a sluice gate was constructed on the Kamokamo River and a lumberyard was open. Lumber felled from the mountain were stored in the lumberyard before being floated down the Toyohira River. In 1887, the lumberyard and its surrounded area, were converted into an amusement park.

In 1957, Nakajima Park officially became a City Park.

Access 
Namboku Line: Nakajima-Kōen Station and Horohira-Bashi Station
Sapporo Streetcar: Nakajima-Kōen-Dōri Station

Gallery

External links 
 Sapporo Parks' website 
 Park website 

Chūō-ku, Sapporo
Parks and gardens in Sapporo